Old Colony Correctional Center is a Massachusetts Department of Correction men's prison in Bridgewater, Massachusetts. The medium security facility is located in a  plot of land in the Bridgewater Correctional Complex with the Bridgewater State Hospital and the Massachusetts Treatment Center. Old Colony Correctional Center Minimum Unit is under the authority of the correctional center. As of January 6, 2020 there were 553 medium and 106 minimum inmates in general population beds.

Covid Cases 
Pursuant to the Supreme Judicial Court's April 3, 2020 Opinion and Order in the Committee for Public Counsel Services v. Chief Justice of the Trial Court, SJC-12926 matter, as amended on April 10, April 28 and June 23, 2020 (the “Order”), the Special Master posts weekly reports which are located on the SJC website here for COVID testing and cases for each of the correctional facilities administered by the Department of Correction and each of the county Sheriffs’ offices. The SJC Special master link above has the most up to date information reported by the correctional agencies and is posted for the public to view.

Notable inmates 
 Neil Entwistle - sentenced for the double murder of his baby daughter, Lillian Rose and wife, Rachel; he was transferred there on December 17, 2008, after receiving death threats at the Souza-Baranowski Correctional Center
Michael M. McDermott, who murdered seven of his coworkers in the 2000 "Wakefield massacre"
Paul Shanley - Priest who was accused and found guilty of raping a male minor. Sentenced to 12 to 15 years.

References

External links

 Old Colony Correctional Center

Prisons in Massachusetts
Buildings and structures in Plymouth County, Massachusetts
Bridgewater, Massachusetts
1987 establishments in Massachusetts